2-Methoxyethoxymethyl chloride is an organic compound with formula .  A colorless liquid, it is classified as a chloroalkyl ether.  It is used as an alkylating agent. In organic synthesis, it is used for introducing the methoxyethoxy ether (MEM) protecting group.  MEM protecting groups are generally preferred to methoxymethyl (MOM) protecting groups, both in terms of formation and removal.

Typically, the alcohol to be protected is deprotonated with a non-nucleophilic base such as N,N-diisopropylethylamine (DIPEA) in dichloromethane followed by addition of 2-methoxyethoxymethyl chloride. 

The MEM protecting group can be cleaved (deprotection) with a range of Lewis and Bronsted acids.

Safety
The closely related chloromethyl methyl ether is a known human carcinogen.

References

Reagents for organic chemistry
Alkylating agents
Protecting groups
Organochlorides
Ethers
IARC Group 1 carcinogens